Achim Glückler (born 10 August 1964, in Maulbronn) is a retired German football player. He spent two seasons in the Bundesliga with VfB Stuttgart and Karlsruher SC.

Honours
 Bundesliga champion: 1983–84

References

External links
 

1964 births
Living people
German footballers
VfB Stuttgart players
VfB Stuttgart II players
Karlsruher SC players
SSV Ulm 1846 players
Bundesliga players
2. Bundesliga players
Association football midfielders